"Even Now" is a song written by Marc Beeson and Randy Sharp, and recorded by American country music group Exile.  It was released in June 1991 as the first single from the album Justice.  The song reached number 16 on the Billboard Hot Country Singles & Tracks chart.

Music video
The music video was directed by Bill Young, and premiered on CMT, The Nashville Network, VH-1 Country, GAC, CMT Pure Country, The Country Network & Vevo in early 1991.

Chart performance

References

1991 songs
1991 singles
Exile (American band) songs
Songs written by Marc Beeson
Songs written by Randy Sharp
Arista Nashville singles